David Reynoso (29 January 1926 – 9 June 1994) was a Mexican actor. He appeared in more than 170 films and television shows between 1955 and 1994. He was also a Deputy of The Seventh Federal Electoral District of the Federal District and died from cancer.

Selected filmography
 Ash Wednesday (1958)
 Sonatas (1959)
 The White Renegade (1960)
 Ánimas Trujano (1962)
 Black Wind (1965)
Alma de mi alma (1965)
 Rage (1966)
 Blue Demon contra las diabólicas (1967)
 El muro del silencio (1974)
 The House in the South (1975)
 Stick (film) (1985)
 The Last Tunnel (1988)

References

External links

1926 births
1994 deaths
Mexican male film actors
People from Aguascalientes
Deaths from cancer in Mexico
20th-century Mexican male actors